Pantin is a commune in the northeastern suburbs of Paris, France. In 2019 its population was estimated to be 59,846. Pantin is located on the edge of the city of Paris and is mainly formed by a plain crossed by national roadway 2 and 3, the Paris–Strasbourg railway line and the canal de l'Ourcq.

Geography
Pantin borders the Paris Boulevard Périphérique, an inner ring road, and is traversed by national routes N2 and N3, as well as the Paris-Strasbourg railway line and the Ourcq canal.

Name
The name Pantin was recorded for the first time in 1067 as Pentini, perhaps from the Roman patronym Pentinus, a variant of Pantaenus or Repentinus, but this etymology is not certain. 

In 2023 the name was changed symbolically to Pantine, with an added "e" ending to indicate the feminine form and promote awareness of women's issues.

History
On 1 January 1860, the city of Paris was enlarged by annexing neighbouring communes. On that occasion, a small part of the commune of Pantin was annexed to Paris.

On 24 July 1867, a part of the territory of Pantin was detached and merged with a part of the territory of Romainville and a part of the territory of Bagnolet to create the commune of Les Lilas.

By 1875, the Canal de l'Ourcq (Ourcq canal) and new railway lines served to divide the town into two parts—the "Village" and the "Quatre Chemins".

Heraldry

Future
The recent construction of a science park along the Bassin de la Villette on the former site of city abattoirs has improved pedestrian access to Paris, as well as encouraging urban regeneration in Pantin itself. A key policy discussed since the 2008 mayoral election has been the possibility of integrating the ten banlieue towns of Bagnolet, Les Lilas, Le Pré-Saint-Gervais, Romainville, Pantin, Noisy-le-Sec, Montreuil, Bobigny, Bondy and Rosny-sous-Bois into an "intercommune" of around 440,000 people. This new municipality could be created as early as January 2010. This project was implemented, it gathers nine communes. In 2016, Pantin was declared France's most polluted town by the World Health Organization.

Demographics

Immigration

Economy

Pantin was once the site of Motobecane's operations.

2,000 companies are located in Pantin, including 21 of more than 100 employees. Huge firms are located in the town, like Hermès (580 jobs – upholstery and luxury luggage), Bourjois, Chanel, Gucci, Agnès b., Sergent-Major, Elis (500 jobs – linen rental), Forclum, UTB (400 jobs – public works), Photovista Legrand, BNP Paribas, Boiron, Alliance Healthcare, Vetura, Fabio Lucci ... and publishers as computer Software Arkeia Software and MT Software.

3,000 employees of BNP Paribas Securities Services were installed in the historic building Grands Moulins de Pantin at the end of October 2009.

Hermès finished an expansion project in the city center.

The city has created a "craft center" to "4 Chemins" especially with the House Revel to promote arts jobs.

Pantin is home to a hub of non-profit environmental organization, housed since 2014 in the "cité de l'environnement", like Bruitparif, the noise observatory of Île-de-France that monitors the environmental noise in the Paris agglomeration.

Administration

Since the French canton reform which came into effect in March 2015, Pantin is part of the canton of Pantin, which also includes the commune Le Pré-Saint-Gervais.

The current mayor of Pantin is Bertrand Kern of the Parti Socialiste (PS). Kern was re-elected in 2014 for a third 6-year mayoral term.

Transport
Pantin is served by three stations on Paris Metro line 5: Hoche, Église de Pantin, and Bobigny–Pantin–Raymond Queneau.

Pantin is also served by Aubervilliers–Pantin–Quatre Chemins station on Paris Metro line 7.

Pantin is also served by Pantin station on Paris RER line E.

Finally Pantin is served by numerous bus lines (151, 152, 249, 148). Outside the hours of normal public transport the town is served by the N13 and N142 Noctilien night bus services with stops outside the Centre de la Danse, the Mairie and Rue Delizy.

Pantin is recently served by the tramway 3b (Delphine Seyrig; Elle Fitzerald: Grands Moulins de Pantin).

Education
The commune has 11 preschools, 11 elementary schools (including one specialised school), four public junior high schools, one private junior high school, and three public senior high schools.
Public junior high schools: Jean-Jaurès, Jean-Lolive, Joliot-Curie, and Lavoisier
Private junior high school: Collège Prive Saint-Joseph-la-Salle
Public senior high schools: Lycée Lucie-Aubrac, Lycée Simone-Weil, and Lycée Marcelin-Berthelot

Personalities
 Jean-François Joseph Geffrard de La Motte, count de Sanois, was Lord of Pantin before the Revolution.
 Beaumarchais, writer, owned land in Pantin
 La Guimard (1743–1816), danser of the Opera
 Léon Jouhaux (1879–1954), syndicalist and Nobel Peace
 Jean-Marc Mormeck (born in 1972), boxing champion
 Faïza Guène (born in 1985), novelist 
Pantin was the birthplace of:
 Jean-Luc Chaignaud (born in 1959), baritone
 Pierre Desproges (1939–1988), humorist
 Philippe Delorme (born 1960), historian and journalist
Jérôme Guedj (born 1972), politician
 Gabriel Obertan (born 1989), footballer playing for Levski (Sofia)

Culture
Pantin is twin cities with the Modigliani Art Center in Scandicci, a suburb of Florence, Italy, which inaugurated their XXXIV Year Salon of Painting with the Pantin art association, Les Amis des Arts.

The Centre national de la danse (CND, or National Dance Center) is an institution sponsored by the French Ministry of Culture. It studies dance in all its aspects, and is located in Pantin. The building is known for being a classic example of Brutalist architecture, and in 2004 was awarded the Prix de l'Équerre d'Argent.

Religion
 Catholic church
 Islam
 Judaism
 Macedonian Orthodox church
 Reformed church

See also
 Cimetière parisien de Pantin
 Communes of the Seine-Saint-Denis department

References

External links

 Official website

Communes of Seine-Saint-Denis